The short-snout pugolovka (Benthophilus leptorhynchus) is a deepwater species of goby widespread in the central part of the Caspian Sea at the depth of , with salinity 10–13.5‰.  It is found along the western coast of the Caspian Sea from the mouth of the Sulak River to Baku at south.  This species can reach a length of  TL.

References

Benthophilus
Fish of the Caspian Sea
Fish of Western Asia
Endemic fauna of the Caspian Sea
Fish described in 1877